There are numerous reportedly haunted locations in France. This list alphabetizes by region (including overseas regions and collectivities) these places and then alphabetically within each region (including overseas regions and collectivities).

Regions

Brittany
Château de Trécesson: has various paranormal legends according to believers.

Île-de-France

Catacombes de Paris : It is said to be haunted by strange orbs and human figures from different centuries.
Eiffel Tower
Château de Versailles: once home to the French royal family between 1682 and 1789, a few tourists and employees have reported seeing people in 18th-century clothing.

Cimetière du Père-Lachaise: the largest cemetery in Paris, France; in the northeast part of the modern city, it is the most visited cemetery in the world, and is said to be one of the most haunted cemeteries in Europe.
Louvre
Notre-Dame de Paris
Jardin des Tuileries
Parc Montsouris
Place de la Bastille

Normandy
Mont-Saint-Michel
Mortemer, Seine-Maritime: ghostly sightings of monks wandering the area have been reported.

Nouvelle-Aquitaine
Château de Bonaguil
Château de Puymartin

Occitanie
Palavas-les-Flots

Pays de la Loire

Château de Brissac: legend says that Jacques de Brézé caught his wife, Charlotte, with another man, and in a fit of rage murdered them both.
Château de Châteaubriant: this castle in the Loire-Atlantique département of western France is said to be haunted by the ghost of Françoise de Foix, a mistress of King Francis I. According to the legend, she was locked in her bed chambers by her husband, Jean de Laval-Châteaubriant, Governor of Brittany, jealous of her relationship with the King. She died on 16 October 1537, rumored to have been either poisoned or bled to death.

Provence-Alpes-Côte d'Azur
Gréoux-les-Bains

References

 
French culture-related lists
France